Choeromorpha is a genus of longhorn beetles of the subfamily Lamiinae, containing the following species:

subgenus Achoeromorpha
 Choeromorpha brunneomaculata Breuning, 1935
 Choeromorpha nigromaculata Breuning, 1981

subgenus Choeromorpha
 Choeromorpha albofasciata Breuning, 1936
 Choeromorpha albovaria Breuning, 1954
 Choeromorpha amica (White, 1856)
 Choeromorpha callizona (White, 1856)
 Choeromorpha celebiana Breuning, 1947
 Choeromorpha flavolineata Breuning, 1939
 Choeromorpha irrorata (Pascoe, 1857)
 Choeromorpha lambii (Pascoe, 1866)
 Choeromorpha latefasciata Newman, 1842
 Choeromorpha mediofasciata Breuning, 1974
 Choeromorpha multivittata Breuning, 1974
 Choeromorpha murina Breuning, 1939
 Choeromorpha muscaria (Heller, 1915)
 Choeromorpha mystica (Pascoe, 1869)
 Choeromorpha panayensis Heller, 1923
 Choeromorpha pigra Chevrolat, 1843
 Choeromorpha polynesus (White, 1856)
 Choeromorpha polyspila (Pascoe, 1865)
 Choeromorpha subfasciata (Pic, 1922)
 Choeromorpha subviolacea Heller, 1923
 Choeromorpha sulphurea (Pascoe, 1865)
 Choeromorpha trifasciata Newman, 1842
 Choeromorpha violaceicornis Heller, 1921
 Choeromorpha vivesi Breuning, 1978
 Choeromorpha wallacei (White, 1856)

References

 
Mesosini